The 2013 Remus F3 Cup was the 32nd Austria Formula 3 Cup season and the first Remus F3 Cup season.

Despite missing the last round, Christopher Höher of Franz Wöss Racing was crowned champion by 118 points over Jo Zeller Racing driver Thomas Amweg. Höher was only 16 years old at the end of the season. Dr. Ulrich Drechsler became the Trophy class champion for the first time.

Teams and drivers
All Cup cars were built between 2005 and 2011, while Trophy cars were built between 1992 and 2004.

Calendar & Race results

External links
Website of the AFR Cups [German]

Austria Formula 3 Cup
Remus F3 Cup
Remus F3 Cup